Karalachik (Qoralasıq) is a rural locality (a selo) and the administrative centre of Karalachiksky Selsoviet, Fyodorovsky District, Bashkortostan, Russia. The population was 553 as of 2010. There are 16 streets.

Geography 
Karalachik is located 12 km southeast of Fyodorovka (the district's administrative centre) by road. Balyklybashevo is the nearest rural locality.

References 

Rural localities in Fyodorovsky District